De Boom Die Alles Zag ( The Tree That Saw It All) is a grey poplar (Populus × canescens) tree located in Bijlmermeer, Amsterdam, the Netherlands, that survived the crash of El Al Flight 1862 on 4 October 1992. Due to the eye-shaped patterns on its trunk, the tree was considered to be an eyewitness of the accident and its aftermath. An official memorial was later built next to the tree, where the accident is commemorated every year on its anniversary. It is also a part of a larger monument, The Growing Monument.

The tree was damaged due to the crash and fire, and lost a part of its roots during the subsequent clean-up of the soil. This made it necessary to support it with two cables attached to neighbouring trees. The soil under it was replaced in 2017 to stimulate root growth. Its condition improved in 2021 according to pulling tests, but the tree is still supported by the cables to prevent it from falling.

The tree 
De Boom Die Alles Zag is a grey poplar (Populus × canescens). De Volkskrant was not able to find the exact age of the tree. It is located on the Nellesteinpad in Bijlmermeer.

Crash of El Al Flight 1862 

On 4 October 1992, El Al Flight 1862, a cargo flight from Amsterdam Schiphol Airport (AMS/EHAM) to Tel Aviv Ben Gurion Airport (TLV/LLBG) operated by a Boeing 747-200 of El Al Israel Airlines, crashed into the flats at Bijlmermeer 15 minutes after taking off. The accident killed 43 people.

De Boom Die Alles Zag was located next to the buildings into which the plane crashed. It survived the impact and the subsequent fire. Many other trees were removed during cleaning of soil at the accident site, polluted by harmful substances which leaked onto it, but De Boom Die Alles Zag was not removed. It did, however, lose a part of its roots during the sanitization process, which caused the tree to become crooked. Due to the eye-shaped patterns on the trunk, the species is also called the "ogenboom" ( eyetree) in The Netherlands and the tree is therefore considered to be an eyewitness of "the panic[,] upheaval [and] the aftermath in the years that followed [the crash]."

Subsequent history 

After the accident, the soil under the tree was replaced with sand. The roots only recovered to a limited extent. It was later attached to the trees next to it with two cables to prevent it from completely falling over. In 2013, its crown was reduced in size following a test which had showed that the tree was unstable. The sand was replaced with soil in 2017 in order to stimulate root growth. The Bijlmer Museum—which includes the tree—has been a "" since 2018. In 2020, it was reported that the tree had a parasitic fungus in the base of its trunk. Two further tests the following year where the tree was pulled with a force of  showed that its condition had improved, but still was worse than ideal. As a result, the cables were loosened but not fully removed.

Monument and legacy 
According to De Volkskrant, residents and victims set up a temporary memorial place around the tree "almost immediately" after the disaster. A wooden box designed by artist Lucas van Herwaarden was built around the tree in 1992. An official monument by the Dutch Government was later constructed at the same place. The disaster is commemorated every year on its anniversary at the monument next to the tree. De Boom Die Alles Zag and its surroundings are a part of a larger monument dedicated to the crash called The Growing Monument (Dutch: Het Groeiend Monument). The tree is "the heart of the monument".

A 2017 documentary about the disaster by Dutch TV programme Andere Tijden is named after the tree. On 28 August 2020, the tree was selected as the "Tree of the Year" of the province of North Holland, allowing it to compete in the national contest, where it finished in fourth place. In September 2022, the Government of Amsterdam listed it as the third most beautiful tree of the city.

References

Citations

Bibliography 

Individual trees in the Netherlands
Amsterdam-Zuidoost
Culture in Amsterdam
Monuments and memorials in the Netherlands